Harold Avington Throckmorton (April 12, 1897 – November 5, 1973) was an American tennis player in the early 20th century.

Biography
He was born on April 12, 1897, in Hackensack, New Jersey.

He played intercollegiate tennis for Princeton University. He was champion of the state of New Jersey. In 1917 he won the men's doubles titles at the U.S. National Championships with Fred Alexander.

In 1918, he served in the artillery in the United States Army. After the war, he became a businessman. He died in 1973. He left $2,500 for the care of his Irish terrier.

Grand Slam finals

Doubles (1 title)

References

External links
 Grand Slam History profile

1897 births
1973 deaths
19th-century American people
19th-century male tennis players
American male tennis players
Sportspeople from Elizabeth, New Jersey
Tennis people from New Jersey
United States National champions (tennis)
Grand Slam (tennis) champions in men's doubles